Ardistama, also known as Arissama, was a town of ancient Cappadocia, inhabited by Hittites in Hellenistic, Roman, and Byzantine times. It was discovered in 1904 by Thomas Callander. Its name may have been derived from Angdisis or Angdistis.

Its site is located near Kale Tepe, Asiatic Turkey.

References

Populated places in ancient Cappadocia
Former populated places in Turkey
Populated places of the Byzantine Empire
Roman towns and cities in Turkey
History of Konya Province